Mount Abraham Union High School is a public high school in Bristol, Vermont (U.S.).

References

External links
 

Public high schools in Vermont
Schools in Addison County, Vermont